Manda is an administrative ward in Ludewa District in the Njombe Region of Tanzania. In 2016 the Tanzania National Bureau of Statistics report there were 4,443 people in the ward, from 4,304 in 2012.

Manda is a small town along Lake Nyasa (Nyasa means Lake), in Ludewa District. The small town of Manda was known as Wiedhafen during the time of German East Africa. Germans promoted commerce and economic growth. Lake Nyasa in Tanzania also known as Lake Malawi in Malawi, and Lago Niassa in Mozambique is one of the truly wonderful places in the world.

The lake itself is the 5th largest in the world by volume, the second largest in Tanzania and Africa, and has been in existence for millions of years (estimates range from about 8mya). In just one lake it contains over a thousand species of fishes. The largest river flowing into it is the Ruhuhu River in Manda, and there is an outlet at its southern end, the Shire River, a tributary that flows into the very large Zambezi River in Mozambique.

The majority of the species are in the family cichlinae, popular with aquarists, but there are also lungfish, elephant-noses, mastacemblid eels and catfish. They are often very colourful and have interesting behaviours - making for fascinating fish-watching. The great diversity in the lake means that most species have unique adaptations and occupy specialised ecological roles in the lake. Some scrape algae from the rocks, some filter sand, some eat snails, some live in empty snail shells, some eat plants, some eat fish, some eat scales, some mimic dead fish to allow them to catch unwary prey. Most are maternal mouth breeders, which mean that the females carry the eggs and young (!) around in their mouths. All of this in a lake that offers warm, clear water, with white sands and clean hot rocks to sunbathe on. It is surrounded by vast plains and the impressive Livingstone Mountains. Manda has experience a ton of historical legacies, ranging from being the host of naval battle between the British and the German.

References

Wards of Dodoma Region